Willi Brandt may refer to:
Willy Brandt (1913–1992), German statesman
Willy Brandt (Oz), fictional character
Willi Brandt (composer) (1869–1923), German composer

See also
Bill Brandt (1904–1983), British photojournalist